Jon Sanders (born 1 April 1943 in Kent) is a British film director. His first feature film Painted Angels was released in 1997.

After Cambridge, Sanders studied film at the Slade School of Fine Art under Thorold Dickinson. As a sound recordist he worked on From Mao to Mozart: Isaac Stern in China which won the 1981 Academy Award for best feature-length documentary.

In the 1980s he made documentaries for television which included Then When the World Changed (1983) for Channel 4, co-directed with cameraman Roger Deakins.

Directing 
Sanders' feature film Painted Angels starring Kelly McGillis and Brenda Fricker was about the lives of prostitutes in the Wild West. It premièred at the International Film Festival Rotterdam.

References 

British film directors
1943 births
Living people